Alfred Byrne (17 March 1882 – 13 March 1956) was an Irish politician who served as a Member of Parliament (MP), as a Teachta Dála (TD) and as Lord Mayor of Dublin. He was known as the "Shaking Hand of Dublin".

Early life
The second of seven children, he was the son of Thomas Byrne, an engineer, and Fanny Dowman. His childhood home was at 36 Seville Place, a terraced house with five rooms just off the North Strand in Dublin. Byrne dropped out of school at the age of 13, and was soon juggling jobs as a grocer's assistant and a bicycle mechanic. Eventually he used his savings to buy a pub on Talbot Street. He married Elizabeth Heagney in 1910.

Early political career

Byrne became an Alderman on Dublin Corporation in 1914. He was a member of the Dublin Port and Docks Board, a significant position for a politician from the Dublin Harbour constituency. In the records of the Oireachtas his occupation is given as company director. He was elected as MP for Dublin Harbour in a by-election on 1 October 1915, following the death of William Abraham, as a candidate of the Irish Parliamentary Party. The Easter Rising in 1916 was followed by the rapid decline of the Irish Parliamentary Party and the rise of Sinn Féin. At the general election in 1918 Byrne was defeated by a Sinn Féin candidate, Philip Shanahan.

Byrne was elected as an Independent TD supporting the Anglo-Irish Treaty for the Dublin Mid constituency at the general election to the Third Dáil in 1922. From 1923 to 1928 he represented Dublin North. He was an elected member of Seanad Éireann, for a six-year term from 1928. He vacated his Dáil seat on 4 December 1928. He resigned from the Seanad on 10 December 1931, and returned to the Dáil in 1932. He remained a TD until his death in 1956, representing Dublin North (1932–1937) and Dublin North-East (1937–1956). In several elections he secured more votes than any other politician in the country.

Lord Mayor (1930–1939)

Byrne was elected as Lord Mayor of Dublin in 1930, serving in the post for nine consecutive years. When cycling or walking around the city he dispensed lollipops to children, who were often seen chasing him down the street. With a handshake and a few words for all, his eternal canvassing soon earned him the first of his nicknames: the Shaking Hand of Dublin. Married with eight children, Byrne treated the people of Dublin as his second family. Every morning he would find up to fifty people waiting for him in the Mansion House. None had appointments. All were met. Byrne answered 15,000 letters in his first year as Lord Mayor. Many were from Dubliners looking for a job, a house, some advice or a reference. One morning in 1931 a journalist watched the Lord Mayor attend to his correspondence. Within an hour he accepted "seventeen invitations to public dinners, one invitation to a public entertainment and eight invitations to public functions." Then he dictated forty-three sympathetic letters to men and women looking for employment. In 1937, children between the ages of eight and eleven years old were being sentenced to spend up to five years in Industrial Schools. Their crime was stealing a few apples from an orchard. When Byrne said such sentences were "savage," a judge responded with a defence of the Industrial School system, urging an end to "ridiculous Mansion House mummery." Byrne stood firm: "For the punishment of trifling offences the home of the children is better than any institution." In 1938, Byrne was favoured by the press for the presidency of Ireland, a ceremonial role created in the new Constitution, but he was outgunned by the political establishment.

Relations with the United States and the United Kingdom

When, in 1935, Byrne became the first Lord Mayor of Dublin to visit North America in 40 years, he was granted the freedom of Toronto, and The New York Times hailed the arrival of a "champion showman." Byrne often extended a hand of friendship to Britain. He also improved relations between Dublin (until recently the centre of British authority) and the rest of the country. One night Dublin Fire Brigade got an urgent call for assistance from Clones. As Lord Mayor, Byrne felt obliged to join the men on top of the fire engine as they set off on the 85-mile journey in the middle of the night.

Anti-communist connections
In August 1936, Byrne addressed the inaugural meeting of the anti-communist Irish Christian Front, some of whose members later expressed anti-Semitic views. In 1938, as Lord Mayor, he presented a gift of a replica of the Ardagh Chalice to Italian naval cadets visiting Dublin on board two warships, who had been welcomed by the Irish government despite the protests of Dubliners. A photograph exists of Byrne giving a fascist salute along with Eoin O'Duffy, commander of the Blueshirts, around 1933.

Final term as Lord Mayor (1954)
In 1954, Byrne was elected as Lord Mayor for a record tenth time. This time he did not live in the Mansion House, but stayed in Rathmines with his family, taking the bus to work each morning. He was just as devoted to the job. When flooding damaged 20,000 houses in Fairview and North Strand, he rose from his sick bed to organise a relief fund. Byrne's final term as Lord Mayor came to an end in 1955. Shortly afterwards, Trinity College Dublin awarded him an honorary Doctorate of Law, describing him as a "champion of the poor and needy, and a friend of all men."

Death
Alfie Byrne died on 13 March 1956. An obituary in The Irish Times noted:

 
 
Byrne's funeral was the largest seen in Dublin for many years. The Evening Herald reported that "Traffic in O'Connell Street was held up for almost 20 minutes to allow the cortege of over 150 motor cars to pass, and at all the junctions along the route to Glasnevin people silently gathered to pay tribute to one of Dublin’s most famous sons". The Irish Times noted that "one of the largest groups of people gathered at the Five Lamps, one of the few places at which Alderman Byrne always made a speech during his election campaign for Dublin North-East." The Irish Press reported a tribute by the Taoiseach, John A Costello, "He had great personal charm and was known for his old-world courtliness both at home and abroad.... We mourn in the passing of Alfie Byrne the loss of an honoured and distinguished Irishman whose place in the hearts of his fellow countrymen was unique and who gave a lifetime of unselfish devotion to their service." The members of the Dáil stood and observed a short silence as a mark of respect. A telegram was sent to his widow from the Mayor of New York, Robert F. Wagner Jr., expressing deepest sympathy, and stating "that Ald. Byrne had attained high office of Lord Mayor many times, but he never lost contact with the poor and the underprivileged, whose champion he was".

Legacy
The press called him the "Shaking Hand of Dublin", Alfred the Great, and The Lord Mayor of Ireland, but most people knew him simply as Alfie. As one of the most popular Dublin-born politicians of the 20th century, he did not write a memoir. The by-election caused by his death, was won by his son Patrick Byrne. Two other sons A. P. Byrne and Thomas Byrne were also TDs for various Dublin constituencies. Alfie Byrne Road in Clontarf is named after him.  The Dublin Bay North branch of Young Fine Gael was renamed 'Alfie Byrne YFG'.

Alfie Byrne also holds the distinction of being the only person to serve as Councillor, Alderman, Lord Mayor of Dublin, MP, TD and Senator.

See also
Families in the Oireachtas

References

Further reading
Who's Who of British Members of Parliament: Vol. II 1886-1918, edited by M. Stenton & S. Lees (The Harvester Press 1978)

External links

1882 births
1956 deaths
Burials at Glasnevin Cemetery
Independent TDs
Independent members of Seanad Éireann
Irish Parliamentary Party MPs
Irish anti-communists
Lord Mayors of Dublin
Members of the 3rd Dáil
Members of the 4th Dáil
Members of the 5th Dáil
Members of the 6th Dáil
Members of the 7th Dáil
Members of the 8th Dáil
Members of the 9th Dáil
Members of the 10th Dáil
Members of the 11th Dáil
Members of the 12th Dáil
Members of the 13th Dáil
Members of the 14th Dáil
Members of the 15th Dáil
Members of the 1928 Seanad
Members of the 1931 Seanad
Members of the Parliament of the United Kingdom for County Dublin constituencies (1801–1922)
Politicians from County Dublin
UK MPs 1910–1918